Alurak (also Romanized as Ālūrak) is a village in Doab Rural District, Bazoft District, Kuhrang County, Chaharmahal and Bakhtiari Province, Iran. At the 2006 census, its population was 17, in 4 families.

References 

Populated places in Kuhrang County